Eutrichopidia is a genus of moths of the family Noctuidae. The genus was erected by George Hampson in 1901.

Species
 Eutrichopidia latinus Donovan, 1805
 Eutrichopidia macchia Holloway, 1979

References

Agaristinae